The Ubaté River is a river on the Altiplano Cundiboyacense, Cundinamarca, Colombia.

Etymology 
The name Ubaté comes from the native name "Ebate", in Muysccubun meaning "bloodied land" or "sower of the mouth".

Description 

The Ubaté River originates as the confluence of the El Hato and La Playa Rivers. El Hato River originates in the municipality Tausa. The Ubaté River flows northward through the Ubaté-Chiquinquirá Valley and drains into Lake Fúquene, at the border with Boyacá.

See also 

List of rivers of Colombia

References 

Rivers of Colombia
Geography of Cundinamarca Department
Rivers
Ubate